Mirny is a rural locality (a settlement) in Krasnooktyabrskoye Rural Settlement of Maykopsky District, Russia. The population was 17 as of 2018. There are 2 streets.

Geography 
Mirny is located 26 km west of Tulsky (the district's administrative centre) by road. Prirechny is the nearest rural locality.

References 

Rural localities in Maykopsky District